Volkmann's canals, also known as perforating holes or channels, are anatomic arrangements in cortical bones. Volkmann's canals are inside osteons. They interconnect the haversian canals with each other and the periosteum. They usually run at obtuse angles to the haversian canals and contain anastomosing vessels between haversian capillaries. They were named after German physiologist Alfred Volkmann (1800-1878).
Volkmann's canals are any of the small channels in the bone that transmit blood vessels from the periosteum into the bone and that communicate with the haversian canals.
The perforating canals provide energy and nourishing elements for osteons.

Additional images

References

Skeletal system